Wabasha is a city and the county seat of Wabasha County, Minnesota. The population was 2,559 at the time of the 2020 census. It is on the Mississippi River, near its confluence with the Zumbro River.

Name
Wabasha is named after the Mdewakanton Dakota mixed-blood (with Anishinaabe) chiefs Wapi-sha, or red leaf (wáȟpe šá - leaf red), father (1718–1806), son (1768–1855), and grandson (±1816–1876) of the same name. The second, Wabishaw the son, signed the 1830 USA treaty with the "Confederated Tribes of the Sacs and Foxes; the Medawah-Kanton, Wahpacoota, Wahpeton and Sissetong Bands or Tribes of Sioux; the Omahas, Ioways, Ottoes and Missourias" in Prairie du Chien. The grandson, Wabasha III (±1816–1876), signed the 1851 and 1858 treaties that ceded the southern half of what is now the state of Minnesota to the United States, beginning the removal of his band to the Minnesota River, then removal from Minnesota to Crow Creek Reservation in Dakota Territory, then to the Santee Reservation in Nebraska, where the last chief Wabasha died.

History
Wabasha was platted in 1854.

Geography
U.S. Highway 61 and Minnesota Highway 60 are two of the main routes in the city. Wisconsin Highways 25 and 35 are nearby.

The city of Wabasha is on the Mississippi River at the foot of Lake Pepin.

Climate
The Köppen Climate Classification subtype for this climate is "Dfb"(Warm Summer Continental Climate).

Demographics

2020 census
As of the census of 2020, the population was 2,559. The racial makeup of the city was 93.0% White, 1.4% Black or African American, 0.4% Asian, 0.3% Native American, 0.2% Pacific Islander, 0.6% from other races, and 4.1% from two or more races. Ethnically, the population was 2.6% Hispanic or Latino of any race.

2010 census
As of the census of 2010, there were 2,521 people, 1,144 households, and 654 families living in the city. The racial makeup of the city was 96.2% White, 0.8% African American, 0.4% Native American, 0.2% Asian, 1.0% from other races, and 1.3% from two or more races. Hispanic or Latino of any race were 2.3% of the population.

There were 1,144 households, of which 23.1% had children under the age of 18 living with them, 44.2% were married couples living together, 9.4% had a female householder with no husband present, 3.5% had a male householder with no wife present, and 42.8% were non-families. 37.9% of all households were made up of individuals, and 17.1% had someone living alone who was 65 years of age or older. The average household size was 2.09 and the average family size was 2.72.

The median age in the city was 48.8 years. 19.4% of residents were under the age of 18; 5.5% were between the ages of 18 and 24; 20.1% were from 25 to 44; 28.2% were from 45 to 64; and 26.8% were 65 years of age or older. The gender makeup of the city was 47.2% male and 52.8% female.

2000 census
As of the census of 2000, there were 2,599 people, 1,062 households, and 665 families living in the city. The racial makeup of the city was 97.96% White, 0.69% African American, 0.54% Native American, 0.15% Asian, 0.19% from other races, and 0.46% from two or more races. Hispanic or Latino of any race were 0.31% of the population.

There were 1,062 households, out of which 26.4% had children under the age of 18 living with them, 52.5% were married couples living together, 7.7% had a female householder with no husband present, and 37.3% were non-families. 32.3% of all households were made up of individuals, and 15.4% had someone living alone who was 65 years of age or older. The average household size was 2.27 and the average family size was 2.85.

In the city, the population was spread out, with 22.0% under the age of 18, 6.3% from 18 to 24, 23.3% from 25 to 44, 25.9% from 45 to 64, and 22.4% who were 65 years of age or older. The median age was 44 years. For every 100 females, there were 90.0 males. For every 100 females age 18 and over, there were 84.2 males.

The median income for a household in the city was $35,291, and the median income for a family was $45,391. Males had a median income of $34,223 versus $24,167 for females. The per capita income for the city was $20,374. About 5.2% of families and 10.0% of the population were below the poverty line, including 10.8% of those under age 18 and 14.3% of those age 65 or over.

Arts and culture
The National Eagle Center is in Wabasha. Wabasha is also home to Minnesota's oldest Episcopal church, Grace Memorial Episcopal Church, which features a Tiffany stained-glass window.

Notable people
 Larry Brandenburg, Actor
John R. Foley, one-term congressman from Maryland
 Joyce M. Lund, journalist and Minnesota state legislator
 Chief Tamaha, Mdewakanton Sioux chief
 Tom Tiffany, Congressman from 
 Jim "Baron Von" Raschke, retired professional wrestler and manager

In popular culture
A sign reading "Welcome to Wabasha, Home of Grumpy Old Men" stands at the city limits. This is a tribute to the 1993 film Grumpy Old Men and its 1995 sequel Grumpier Old Men, both of which are set in Wabasha. Though many of the places the films mention (such as the local VFW and Slippery's Tavern) are in Wabasha, the films were shot in other Minnesota communities. The only scene filmed near Wabasha was the "snow angel" scene, filmed in Red Wing.

References

External links
Wabasha-Kellogg (Minnesota) Convention and Visitors Bureau
City of Wabasha, MN – Official Website

 
Cities in Minnesota
Minnesota populated places on the Mississippi River
County seats in Minnesota
Rochester metropolitan area, Minnesota